Yevhen Serhiyovych Pavlyuk (born 18 August 2002) is a Ukrainian professional footballer who plays as a centre-back for Vorskla Poltava.

Career
Pavlyuk is a product of Molod Poltava and MFA Mukacheve youth sportive school systems.

In August 2019 he was signed by Vorskla Poltava. He made his debut as a second half-time substituted player for Vorskla Poltava in the Ukrainian Premier League in a home winning match against SC Dnipro-1 on 19 June 2020.

References

External links
 
 

2002 births
Living people
Ukrainian footballers
Association football defenders
FC Vorskla Poltava players
FC Kryvbas Kryvyi Rih players
Ukrainian Premier League players